Siniša Branković (born 30 January 1979) is a Serbian soccer player.

Career
Branković began playing football with BSK Batajnica before joining First League of FR Yugoslavia side FK Zemun in 2000.

Branković left Zemun to play in the Ukrainian Premier League with FC Chornomorets Odessa. He also played for Austrian Football First League side Kapfenberger SV during the 2006–07 season. Most recently he played for Kazakhstan Premier League sides FC Kairat and FC Zhetysu.

References

External links
 Profile at FFU website

1979 births
Living people
People from Zemun
Footballers from Belgrade
Serbian footballers
Serbian expatriate footballers
FK Zemun players
FK Banat Zrenjanin players
FC Chornomorets Odesa players
FC Kairat players
Kapfenberger SV players
Ukrainian Premier League players
Serbian expatriate sportspeople in Kazakhstan
Expatriate footballers in Ukraine
FK MKT Araz players
Association football midfielders